The 1980 Ladies European Tour was the second season of golf tournaments organised by the Women's Professional Golfers' Association (WPGA), which later became the Ladies European Tour (LET). The tour was principally sponsored by Carlsberg, who organised ten 36-hole tournaments counting towards their own Order of Merit. There were eleven other tournaments on the schedule including the Women's British Open, organised by the Ladies' Golf Union.

The Order of Merit was won by Muriel Thomson, who also topped the Carlsberg Order of Merit.

Tournaments
The table below shows the 1980 schedule. The numbers in brackets after the winners' names show the number of career wins they had on the Ladies European Tour up to and including that event. This is only shown for members of the tour.

Major championship in bold.

Order of Merit and money list
The Order of Merit was sponsored by Hambro Life and based on a points system.

Carlsberg Order of Merit
The Carlsberg Order of Merit was based on performances in the ten Carslberg sponsored tournaments during the season, with the top three in the standings sharing a prize fund of £5,000.

See also
1980 LPGA Tour

References

External links
Official site of the Ladies European Tour

Ladies European Tour
Ladies European Tour
Ladies European Tour